Riverbank Arts Centre  is a multi-disciplinary (theatre, comedy, music, and visual arts) arts centre in Newbridge, County Kildare, Ireland.

Located close to the M7 motorway, the Riverbank Arts Centre also has a café.

References

External links
Official site

Theatres in County Kildare